William Edward Abbott (1 April 1844 – 14 November 1924) was an Australian politician. He was a member of the New South Wales Legislative Assembly for Upper Hunter as a Protectionist in 1890 and served as president of the Council of the Pastoralists' Union and the Pastoralists' Federal Council of Australia.

Biography 

He was born at Muswellbrook to squatter John Kingsmill Abbott and Frances Amanda Brady. He attended The King's School in Parramatta and Sydney Grammar School, but left at the age of sixteen to run the family farm at Wingen. He eventually owned one of the most valuable estates in the area, totaling . In 1889 he was elected to the New South Wales Legislative Assembly for Upper Hunter as a Protectionist, but was defeated in 1891. From 1890 he was a member of the Council of the Pastoralists' Union, serving as president from 1894 to 1897 and from 1900 to 1910. He was also President of the Pastoralists' Federal Council of Australia in 1891. He published a series of books, including an early work on the effect of rabbits on the Australian environment. Abbott died on his property from a self-induced dose of arsenic in 1924.

References

1844 births
1924 deaths
Members of the New South Wales Legislative Assembly
Protectionist Party politicians
Suicides by poison
Suicides in New South Wales